Yang Qiuxia (born 7 July 1998) is a Chinese para-badminton player.

In 2021, Yang won a gold medal representing China in the women's singles SU5 event of the 2020 Summer Paralympics.

Achievements

Paralympic Games
Women's singles SU5

World Championships 
Women's singles

Mixed doubles

Asian Para Games 
Women's singles

Women's doubles

Asian Championships 
Women's singles

Asian Youth Para Games 
Women's singles

International Tournaments (4 titles, 3 runners-up) 
Women's singles

Women's doubles

References

1998 births
Living people
Chinese para-badminton players
Paralympic badminton players of China
Badminton players at the 2020 Summer Paralympics
Medalists at the 2020 Summer Paralympics
Paralympic medalists in badminton
Paralympic gold medalists for China
Chinese female badminton players